Võ Nguyên Giáp (25 August 1911 – 4 October 2013) was a self-taught Vietnamese general, communist revolutionary and politician. Regarded as one of the greatest military strategists of the 20th century, Giáp commanded Vietnamese communist forces in various wars. He served as the military commander of the Việt Minh and later the People's Army of Vietnam (PAVN) from 1941 to 1972, as the minister of defence of the Democratic Republic of Vietnam (North Vietnam) and later Socialist Republic of Vietnam in 1946–1947 and from 1948 to 1980, and as deputy prime minister from 1955 to 1991. He was also a member of the Politburo of the Communist Party of Vietnam.

Born in Quảng Bình province to an affluent peasant family, and the son of a Vietnamese nationalist, Giáp participated in anti-colonial political activity in his youth and in 1931 joined the Communist Party of Vietnam, led by Ho Chi Minh. Giáp rose to prominence during World War II as the military leader of the Việt Minh resistance against the Japanese occupation, and after the war became the military commander of the anti-colonial forces in the First Indochina War against the French. Giáp won a decisive victory in the 1954 Battle of Dien Bien Phu, that forced the surrender of the French garrison and effectively ending the war. After the partition of Vietnam and the outbreak of the Vietnam War, Giáp fought against South Vietnam and its American supporters. Giáp was commander of the army during the 1968 Tet Offensive, in which he besieged and turned an isolated Marine outpost at Khe Sanh into a diversion for the upcoming offensive. The Marines later abandoned the strategic base after the siege was lifted. Giáp also played a role in the 1972 Easter Offensive, after which he was succeeded by Văn Tiến Dũng, but remained defense minister through the U.S. military withdrawal and the final victory against South Vietnam and the reunification after the final offensive of 1975. After the Vietnamese invasion of Cambodia in 1978 and the overthrow of the Chinese-allied Khmer Rouge regime, Giáp oversaw his final military campaign in the 1979 Sino-Vietnamese War, in which Chinese forces were pushed back across the border. Giáp resigned as defense minister in 1980 and left the Politburo in 1982. He remained on the Central Committee and as deputy prime minister until 1991, and died in 2013 at age 102.

Giáp is regarded as a mastermind military builder; during the First Indochina War, he had transformed a "rag-tag" band of rebels to a "fine light-infantry army" fielding cryptography, artillery and advanced logistics capable of challenging the larger, modernised French Far East Expeditionary Corps and Vietnamese National Army. Giáp never attended any courses at any military academy, nor had any direct military training prior to WW2, and was a history teacher at a French-speaking academy. He also read and was Influenced by many historical leaders, such as Sun Tzu, George Washington, and Vladimir Lenin. Though, he personally cited T. E. Lawrence and Napoleon as his two greatest influences. He later earned the moniker "Red Napoleon" from some Western sources. Giáp was also a highly-effective logistician, and is recognized as the principal architect of the Ho Chi Minh trail, that brought weapons and men from North Vietnam south through Laos and Cambodia, which is recognised as one of the 20th century's great feats of military engineering. 

Giáp is often credited with North Vietnam's military victory over the South Vietnam. Recent scholarship indicates other leaders had played more prominent roles, with former subordinates and later rivals Dũng and Hoàng Văn Thái later assuming a more direct military responsibility than Giáp. Nevertheless, he played a pivotal role in the transformation of the PAVN into "one of the largest, most formidable" mechanised and combined-arms fighting force capable of defeating the Army of the Republic of Vietnam (ARVN) in conventional warfare.

Biography

Early life 
Võ Nguyên Giáp was born on 25 August 1911 (or 1912 according to some sources) in Quảng Bình Province, French Indochina. Giáp's father and mother, Võ Quang Nghiêm and Nguyễn Thị Kiên, worked the land, rented some to neighbours, and lived a relatively comfortable life.

Giáp's father was both a minor official and a committed Vietnamese nationalist, having played a part in the Cần Vương movement in the 1880s. He was arrested for subversive activities by the French colonial authorities in 1919 and died in prison a few weeks later. Giáp had two sisters and one brother, and soon after his father's incarceration, one of his sisters was also arrested. Although she was not held for long, the privations of prison life made her ill and she too died a few weeks after being released.

Giáp was taught at home by his father before going to the village school. His precocious intelligence meant that he was soon transferred to the district school and in 1924, at the age of thirteen, he left home to attend the Quốc Học (also known in English as the "National Academy"), a French-run lycée in Huế. This school had been founded by a Catholic official named Ngo Dinh Kha, and his son, Ngô Đình Diệm also attended it. Diem later became President of South Vietnam (1955–63). Years earlier the same school had educated another boy, Nguyen Sinh Cung, also the son of an official. In 1943 Cung adopted the name Ho Chi Minh.

At age 14, Giáp became a messenger for the Haiphong Power Company. He was expelled from the school after two years for taking part in protests, and went home to his village for a while. While there, he joined the Tân Việt Revolutionary Party, an underground group founded in 1924, which introduced him to communism. He returned to Hue and continued his political activities. He was arrested in 1930 for taking part in student protests and served 13 months of a two-year sentence at Lao Bảo Prison. By Giáp's own account the reason for his release was lack of evidence against him. He joined the Communist Party of Vietnam in 1931 and took part in several demonstrations against French rule in Indochina as well as assisting in founding the Democratic Front in 1933.

Although he denied it, Giáp was said by the historian Cecil B. Currey to have also spent some time in the prestigious Hanoi Lycée Albert Sarraut, where the local elite was educated to serve the colonial regime. He was said to have been in the same class as Phạm Văn Đồng, a future Prime Minister, who also denied having studied at Albert Sarraut, and Bảo Đại, the last Emperor of Annam. From 1933 to 1938, Giáp studied at the Indochinese University in Hanoi where he earned a bachelor's degree in law with a major in political economy.

Political activism 
While a student, Giáp had taken lodgings with Professor Dang Thai Minh, whose daughter, Nguyen Thi Minh Giang (also cited as Nguyễn Thị Quang Thái), he had first met at school in Hue. She too had learned nationalism from her father and had joined the revolutionary activities with which Giáp was involved. In June 1938 (or, according to some sources, April 1939) they were married and in May 1939 they had a daughter, Hong Anh (Red Queen of Flowers). Giáp's busy political activities took a toll on his postgraduate studies, and he failed to pass the examinations for the Certificate of Administrative Law. Unable therefore to practice as a lawyer, he took a job as a history teacher at the Thăng Long School in Hanoi.

As well as teaching in school, Giáp was busy producing and writing articles for Tiếng Dân (Voice of the People) founded by Huỳnh Thúc Kháng and many other revolutionary newspapers, while actively participating in various revolutionary movements. All the while, Giáp was a dedicated reader of military history and philosophy, revering Sun Tzu. He also made a particular study of Napoleon's generalship, and greatly admired T. E. Lawrence's Seven Pillars of Wisdom, learning from it practical examples of how to apply minimum military force to maximum effect. During the Popular Front years in France, he founded Hồn Trẻ tập mới (Soul of Youth), an underground socialist newspaper. He also founded the French-language paper Le Travail (on which Phạm Văn Đồng also worked).

After the signing of the Molotov–Ribbentrop Pact, the French authorities outlawed the Indochinese Communist Party. Its leaders decided that Giáp should leave Vietnam and go into exile in China. On 3 May 1940 he said farewell to his wife, left Hanoi and crossed the border into China. Giáp's wife went to her family home in Vinh, where she was arrested, sentenced to fifteen years imprisonment, and incarcerated in the Hoa Lo Central Prison in Hanoi. In China, Giáp joined up with Hồ Chí Minh, then an adviser to the People's Liberation Army. Giáp adopted the alias Duong Huai-nan, learned to speak and write Chinese, and studied the strategy and tactics of the Chinese Communist Party.

In September 1940, Vichy France agreed to the Japanese occupation of Vietnam, to 'protect' Indochina. In May 1941 the Eighth Congress of the Indochinese Communist Party decided to form the Viet Minh; Giáp was made responsible for establishing an intelligence network and organising political bases in the far north of the country. To begin propaganda work among the population, a news-sheet called Việt Nam Độc Lập was produced. Giáp wrote many articles for it, and was repeatedly criticised by Ho Chi Minh for the excessive verbosity of his writing style.

Military career 

In 1942, Giáp and about forty men moved back into Vietnam and established themselves in remote caves near the village of Vu Nhai. This and similar small groups in the mountains were the basis of the Viet Minh, the armed wing of the Vietnam Independence League. The local Nung hill people spoke little Vietnamese, so Giáp and his colleagues had to learn local dialects and draw pictures to communicate. When Vichy security patrols approached, they would conceal themselves in a cave under a waterfall, or, at times, in the lands of the Man Trang people.

For the next few years he and his comrades worked steadily to build up a small military force and to win local people over to the communist cause. By the end of 1943 several hundred men and women had joined the Viet Minh. It was in the summer of 1943 that Giáp was told that his wife had been beaten to death by guards in the central prison in Hanoi.
Her sister was guillotined and Giáp's daughter died in prison of unknown causes.

In September 1944 the first Revolutionary Party Military Conference was held and it was agreed that the time was now right to take the military struggle forward into a new phase. The formation of the Vietnam Liberation army was proclaimed, with Giáp as its commander. Ho Chi Minh directed him to establish Armed Propaganda Brigades and the first one, consisting of thirty-one men and three women, was formed in December 1944. Named the Tran Hung Dao Platoon after the great Vietnamese hero, it was armed with two revolvers, seventeen rifles, one light machine gun, and fourteen breech-loading flintlocks dating from the Russo-Japanese War.

Ho Chi Minh decided that for propaganda purposes, the Armed Propaganda Unit had to win a military victory within a month of being established, so on 25 December 1944 Giáp led successful attacks against French outposts in the Battles of Khai Phat and Na Ngan. Two French lieutenants were killed and the Vietnamese soldiers in the outposts surrendered. The Viet Minh attackers suffered no casualties. A few weeks later, Giáp was wounded in the leg when his group attacked another outpost at Dong Mu.

Through the first half of 1945, Giáp's military position strengthened as the political position of the French and Japanese weakened. On 9 March the Japanese removed the titular French regime and placed the emperor Bảo Đại at the head of a puppet state, the Empire of Vietnam.

By April the Viet Minh had nearly five thousand members, and was able to attack Japanese posts with confidence. Between May and August 1945, the United States, keen to support anti-Japanese forces in mainland Asia, actively supplied and trained Giáp and the Viet Minh. Major Archimedes Patti, in charge of the so-called 'Deer Team' unit, taught the Viet Minh to use flamethrowers, grenade launchers and machine guns.

In a single month they succeeded in training around 200 hand-picked future leaders of the army they were to oppose a few decades later. Growing stronger, Giáp's forces took more territory and captured more towns up until the announcement on 15 August by the Japanese Emperor of his country's unconditional surrender to the allies.

On 28 August 1945, Giáp led his men into Hanoi, and on 2 September, Ho Chi Minh declared the independence of the Democratic Republic of Vietnam. He formed a new government, with Giáp as Minister of the Interior. Unbeknownst to the Việt Minh, President Harry S. Truman, Prime Minister Winston Churchill and Premier Joseph Stalin had already decided the future of postwar Vietnam at a summit meeting at Potsdam. They agreed that the country would be occupied temporarily to get the Japanese out; the northern half would be under the control of the Nationalist Chinese and the southern half under the British.

On 9 September, the Nationalist Chinese forces crossed the border and quickly took control of the north, while on 12 September, the British Indian Army arrived in Saigon. By October French forces had begun to arrive in Vietnam, and the British handed control of the south back to them and in May 1946, an agreement between the French and the Chinese saw the Chinese withdraw from the north and the French move in there as well. Ho Chi Minh and Võ Nguyên Giáp pursued lengthy negotiations with the French, seeking to avoid an all-out war to cement their independence. Giáp led the Vietnamese delegation at the Dalat conference in April 1946, which yielded nothing, and, returning to Hanoi, he was made Minister of Defense. Ho Chi Minh departed for France on 31 May, to negotiate with the French at Fontainebleau, and he remained in France until November.

With Ho in France, Giáp was effectively in charge of the government in Hanoi. Up to then, the Democratic Republic of Vietnam had allowed nationalist and other newspapers to publish, but when they began attacking and vilifying Giáp he cracked down on them and closed them all. He also deployed Viet Minh forces against non-communist nationalist troops in the suburbs of Hanoi, and had their leaders arrested, imprisoned, or killed. During this period he also began a relationship with a famous and beautiful dancer, Thuong Huyen, and was seen in public with her at nightclubs. This conduct caused serious concern in the upper ranks of the Party as it was contrary to the very strict and abstemious moral code by which all members were expected to abide. Wanting to protect him, Ho Chi Minh arranged for him to meet a graduate from a well-known family, Ba Hanh.

They married in August 1946, and went on to have four children.

First Indochina War 

The tense standoff between the Vietnamese government and the French occupiers escalated dramatically on 23 October when the French commander Argenlieu ordered the cruiser Suffren to bombard Haiphong in response to repeated skirmishes with Vietnamese forces as they tried to bring arms and contraband into the port. Around six thousand people were killed, and fourteen thousand wounded in the bombardment. Giáp, acting as de facto president in the absence of Ho Chi Minh, tried to maintain some kind of peace but by the time Ho returned in November, both sides were on a war footing. Local fighting broke out repeatedly and on 27 November, Ho's government, concluding that it could not hold Hanoi against the French, retreated up into the northern hills where it had been based two years previously. On 19 December, the Vietnamese government officially declared war on France and fighting erupted all over the country. After this time, detailed information on Giáp's personal life becomes much scarcer and in most sources the emphasis is on his military achievements and, later, on his political roles.

The first few years of the war involved mostly a low-level, semi-conventional resistance fight against the French occupying forces. Võ Nguyên Giáp first saw real fighting at Nha Trang, when he traveled to south-central Vietnam in January–February 1946, to convey the determination of leaders in Hanoi to resist the French. However, after the Chinese communists reached the northern border of Vietnam in 1949 and the Vietnamese destruction of French posts there, the conflict turned into a conventional war between two armies equipped with modern weapons supplied by the United States and the Soviet Union.

French Union forces included colonial troops from many parts of the former French empire (Moroccan, Algerian, Tunisian, Laotian, Cambodian, Vietnamese and Vietnamese ethnic minorities), French professional troops and units of the French Foreign Legion. The use of metropolitan recruits (i.e. recruits from France itself) was forbidden by French governments to prevent the war from becoming even more unpopular at home. It was called the "dirty war" (la sale guerre) by supporters of the Left in France and intellectuals (including Jean-Paul Sartre) during the Henri Martin affair in 1950.

When it became clear that France was becoming involved in a long drawn-out and so far not very successful war, the French government tried to negotiate an agreement with the Viet Minh. They offered to help set up a national government and promised that they would eventually grant Vietnam its independence. Ho Chi Minh and the other leaders of the Viet Minh did not trust the word of the French and continued the war.

French public opinion continued to move against the war:
 Between 1946 and 1952 many French troops had been killed, wounded, or captured.
 France was attempting to build up her economy after the devastation of the Second World War. The cost of the war had so far been twice what they had received from the United States under the Marshall Plan.
 The war had lasted for seven years and there was still no sign of a clear French victory.
 A growing number of people in France had reached the conclusion that their country did not have any moral justification for being in Vietnam.
 Parts of the French left supported the goals of the Việt Minh to form a socialist state.

While growing stronger in Vietnam, the Việt Minh also expanded the war and lured the French to spread their force to remote areas such as Laos. In December 1953, French military commander General Henri Navarre set up a defensive complex at Ðiện Biên Phủ in the Mường Thanh Valley, disrupting Việt Minh supply lines passing through Laos. He surmised that in an attempt to reestablish the route, Giáp would be forced to organize a mass attack on Ðiện Biên Phủ, thus fighting a conventional battle, in which Navarre could expect to have the advantage.

Giáp took up the French challenge. While the French dug in at their outpost, the Việt Minh were also preparing the battlefield. While diversionary attacks were launched in other areas, Giáp ordered his men to covertly position their artillery by hand. Defying standard military practice, he had his twenty-four 105 mm howitzers placed on the forward slopes of the hills around Dien Bien Phu, in deep, mostly hand-dug emplacements protecting them from French aircraft and counter-battery fire.

With anti-aircraft guns supplied by the Soviet Union, Giáp was able to severely restrict the ability of the French to supply their garrison, forcing them to drop supplies inaccurately from high altitude. Giáp ordered his men to dig a trench system that encircled the French. From the outer trench, other trenches and tunnels were gradually dug inward towards the center. The Viet Minh were now able to move in close to the French troops defending Dien Bien Phu.

When Navarre realized that he was trapped, he appealed for help. The United States was approached and some advisers suggested the use of tactical nuclear weapons against the Viet Minh, but this was never seriously considered. Another suggestion was that conventional air raids would be enough to scatter Giáp's troops. U.S. President Dwight D. Eisenhower, however, refused to intervene unless the British and other Western allies agreed. British Prime Minister Winston Churchill declined, claiming that he wanted to wait for the outcome of the peace negotiations taking place in Geneva, before becoming involved in escalating the war.

On 13 March 1954, Giap launched his offensive. For 54 days, the Viet Minh seized position after position, pushing the French until they occupied only a small area of Dien Bien Phu. Colonel Piroth, the artillery commander, blamed himself for the destruction of French artillery superiority. He told his fellow officers that he had been "completely dishonoured" and committed suicide with a hand grenade. General De Castries, French Commander in Dien Bien Phu, was captured alive in his bunker. The French surrendered on 7 May. Their casualties totaled over 2,200 killed, 5,600 wounded, and 11,721 taken prisoner. The following day the French government announced that it intended to withdraw from Vietnam.

Giáp's victory over the French was an important inspiration to anti-colonial campaigners around the world, particularly in French colonies, and most particularly in North Africa, not least because many of the troops fighting on the French side in Indochina were from North Africa. The victory at Dien Bien Phu marked the beginning of a new era in the military struggles against colonialism for national liberation and independence movements in Morocco, Algeria, Tunisia and other colonised countries.

Interwar years 
After the French surrender, Giáp moved back into Hanoi as the Vietnamese government re-established itself. He expanded and modernised the army, re-equipping it with Russian and Chinese weapons systems. On 7 May 1955, he inaugurated the Vietnamese Maritime Force and on 1 May 1959, the Vietnamese People's Air Force. During the late 1950s Giáp served as Minister of Defence, Commander in Chief of the People's Army of Vietnam, Deputy Prime Minister, and deputy chairman of the Defence Council. In terms of his personal life, he was also able to move back in with his wife, from whom he had been separated for eight years during the war. She was working as a professor of history and social science at this time. Together they raised two boys and two girls. In the little spare time he had, he said in interviews that he occasionally enjoyed playing the piano, as well as reading Goethe, Shakespeare and Tolstoy.

During the late 1950s the top priority of the re-established Vietnamese government was the rapid establishment of a socialist economic order and Communist Party rule. This involved collectivisation of agriculture and central management of all economic production. This process did not go smoothly and it led to food shortages and revolts. At the 10th Plenum of the Communist Party, 27–29 October 1956, Giáp stood in front of the assembled delegates and said:

The departure of the French and the de facto partition of Vietnam meant that the Hanoi government only controlled the north part of the country. In South Vietnam there were still several thousand guerillas, known as Viet Cong, fighting against the government in Saigon. The Party Plenum in 1957 ordered changes to the structure of these units and Giáp was put in charge of implementing these and building their strength to form a solid basis for an insurrection in the South. The 1959 Plenum decided that the time for escalating the armed struggle in the South was right and in July that year Giáp ordered the opening up of the Ho Chi Minh trail to improve supply lines to Viet Cong units.

Vietnam War 

Giáp remained commander in chief of the People's Army of Vietnam throughout the war against South Vietnam and its allies, the United States, Australia, Thailand, South Korea, and the Philippines. He oversaw the expansion of the PAVN from a small self-defense force into a large conventional army, equipped by its communist allies with considerable amounts of relatively sophisticated weaponry, although this did not usually match the weaponry of the Americans.

Giáp has often been assumed to have been the planner of the Tết Offensive of 1968, but this appears not to have been the case. The best evidence indicates that he disliked the plan, and when it became obvious that Lê Duẩn and Văn Tiến Dũng were going to conduct it anyway, he left Vietnam for medical treatment in Hungary, and did not return until after the offensive had begun. Although this attempt to spark a general uprising against the southern government failed disastrously, it was a significant political victory through convincing American politicians and the public that their commitment to South Vietnam could not be open-ended. Giáp later argued that the Tết Offensive was not a "purely military strategy" but part of a "general strategy, an integrated one, at once military, political and diplomatic."

Peace talks between representatives from the United States, South Vietnam, North Vietnam, and the NLF began in Paris in January 1969. President Richard Nixon, like President Lyndon B. Johnson before him, was convinced that a U.S. withdrawal was necessary, but four years passed before the last American troops departed.

In October 1972, the negotiators came close to agreeing to a formula to end the conflict. The proposal was that the remaining U.S. troops would withdraw from South Vietnam in exchange for a cease-fire and the return of American prisoners held by Hà Nội. It was also agreed that the governments in North and South Vietnam would remain in power, and reunification would be "carried out step by step through peaceful means". Although the North's Nguyễn Huệ Offensive during the spring of 1972 was beaten back with high casualties, the proposal did not require them to leave the South. PAVN would thus be able to maintain a foothold in South Vietnam from which to launch future offensives.

In an effort to put pressure on both North and South Vietnam during the negotiations, President Nixon ordered a series of air raids on Hanoi and Haiphong, codenamed Operation Linebacker II. The operation ended on 29 December 1972, after 12 days with 42 U.S. casualties and over 1600 N.Vietnamese killed. North Vietnam then agreed to sign the Paris Peace Accords that had been proposed in October, although with added conditions favorable to both the U.S. and to North Vietnam. South Vietnam objected, but had little choice but to accept it.

The last U.S. combat troops had left in August 1972.  The remaining US military personnel (except for the staff of the Defense Attache's Office and the US Embassy's Marine guards) completed their withdrawal in March 1973. Despite the agreement, there was no end in fighting. South Vietnamese attempts to regain communist controlled territory inspired their opponents to change strategy. Communist leaders met in Hanoi in March for a series of meetings to plan for a massive offensive against the South. In June 1973, the U.S. Congress passed the Case–Church Amendment, which prohibited any further U.S. military involvement, and the PAVN supply routes could operate normally without any fear of U.S. bombing.

Fall of Saigon 

The standard view of this period is that after Ho Chi Minh's death in September 1969, Giáp lost a power struggle in 1972 shortly after the failed Easter Offensive where he was blamed by the Politburo for the offensive's failure. Giáp was recalled to Hanoi where he was replaced as field commander of the PAVN and from then on watched subsequent events from the sidelines, with the glory of victory in 1975 going to the chief of the general staff, General Văn Tiến Dũng. Giáp's role in the 1975 victory is largely ignored by official Vietnamese accounts.

Later life 

Soon after the fall of Saigon, the Socialist Republic of Vietnam was established. In the new government, Giáp was made Deputy Prime Minister in July 1976. In December 1978 he oversaw the successful Cambodian–Vietnamese War which drove the Khmer Rouge from power and ended the Cambodian genocide. In retaliation, Cambodia's ally China responded by invading the Cao Bang province of Vietnam in January 1979 and once again Giáp was in overall responsibility for the response, which drove the Chinese out after a few months. He finally retired from his post at the Defense Ministry in 1981 and retired from the Politburo in 1982. He remained on the Central Committee and Deputy Prime Minister until he retired in 1991.

Giáp wrote extensively on military theory and strategy. His works include Big Victory, Great Task; People's Army, People's War; Ðiện Biên Phủ; and We Will Win.

In 1995, former U.S. Secretary of Defense Robert McNamara met Giáp to ask what happened on 4 August 1964 in the second Gulf of Tonkin Incident. "Absolutely nothing", Giáp replied. Giáp claimed that the attack on 4 August 1964, had been imaginary.

In a 1998 interview, William Westmoreland criticized the battlefield prowess of Giáp, stating, "By his own admission, by early 1969, I think, he had lost, what, a half million soldiers? He reported this. Now such a disregard for human life may make a formidable adversary, but it does not make a military genius. An American commander losing men like that would hardly have lasted more than a few weeks."

American historian Derek Frisby criticized Westmoreland's view, which he said reflected a failure in understanding Giáp's core philosophy of "revolutionary war". According to Frisby, "Giap understood that protracted warfare would cost many lives but that did not always translate into winning or losing the war. In the final analysis, Giap won the war despite losing many battles, and as long as the army survived to fight another day, the idea of Vietnam lived in the hearts of the people who would support it, and that is the essence of 'revolutionary war'."

In 2009, Giáp became a prominent critic of bauxite mining in Vietnam following government plans to open large areas of the Central Highlands to the practice. Giáp indicated that a 1980s study led experts to advise against mining due to severe ecological damage and national security.

Death and legacy 

On 4 October 2013, the Communist Party of Vietnam and government officials announced that Võ Nguyên Giáp had died, aged 102, at 18:09 local time, at Central Military Hospital 108 in Hanoi. He was given a state funeral on 12–13 October, and his body was laid in state at the national morgue in Hanoi until his burial in his home province of Quảng Bình. After his death, several cities in Vietnam renamed some of their most prominent streets after him.

Awards and decorations

References

Bibliography 

 
 
 
 

 
 
 Morris, Virginia and Hills, Clive (2006). A History of the Ho Chi Minh Trail: The Road to Freedom, Orchid Press.
 Morris, Virginia and Hills, Clive (2018). Ho Chi Minh's Blueprint for Revolution: In the Words of Vietnamese Strategists and Operatives, McFarland & Co Inc.
 Nguyen, Lien-Hang T. Hanoi's War: An International History of the War for Peace in Vietnam. University of North Carolina Press 2012

External links

 . (interview) CNN. Conducted in May 1996, translated from Vietnamese
 General Giáp Biography
 National Liberation Front
 General Vo Nguyen Giáp – Asian Hero
 Vo Nguyen Giáp's interview – PBS
 Bibliography: Writings of Vo Nguyen Giáp, and Books about Him
 Vo Nguyen Giáp on Britannica
 General History
 Booknotes interview with Peter MacDonald on Giap: The Victor in Vietnam, August 29, 1993, C-SPAN

 
1911 births
2013 deaths
People from Quảng Bình province
People of the First Indochina War
North Vietnamese military personnel of the Vietnam War
Generals of the People's Army of Vietnam
World War II resistance members
Guerrilla warfare theorists
Vietnamese people of World War II
Vietnamese Buddhists
Vietnamese communists
Anti-revisionists
Viet Minh members
Vietnamese military writers
Government ministers of Vietnam
Vietnamese centenarians
Men centenarians
Members of the 1st Standing Committee of the Indochinese Communist Party
Members of the 2nd Politburo of the Workers' Party of Vietnam
Members of the 3rd Politburo of the Workers' Party of Vietnam
Members of the 4th Politburo of the Communist Party of Vietnam
Members of the 2nd Secretariat of the Workers' Party of Vietnam
Members of the 1st Central Committee of the Indochinese Communist Party
Members of the 2nd Central Committee of the Workers' Party of Vietnam
Members of the 3rd Central Committee of the Workers' Party of Vietnam
Members of the 4th Central Committee of the Communist Party of Vietnam
Members of the 5th Central Committee of the Communist Party of Vietnam
Members of the 6th Central Committee of the Communist Party of Vietnam
Deputy Prime Ministers of Vietnam
Ministers of Defence of Vietnam
Vietnamese nationalists
Vietnamese revolutionaries
People of the Laotian Civil War
Recipients of the Order of Ho Chi Minh
Hero of the People's Armed Forces
Vietnamese Marxists
Anti-imperialism
People educated at Lycee Albert Sarraut